True American was an antislavery newspaper which was printed in 1845 in Fayette County, Kentucky by Cassius Marcellus Clay. After the publishing of an incendiary anti-slavery editorial titled "What is Become of the Slaves in the United States?" in August 1846, a group of outraged citizens ran the newspaper out of Lexington, Kentucky with a court injunction. Cassius continued to publish his paper through 1847 after moving his publishing company to Cincinnati, Ohio.

References

Abolitionist newspapers published in the United States
Defunct newspapers published in Cincinnati
Defunct newspapers published in Kentucky